The 1972 United States Senate election in Mississippi was held on November 7, 1972. Incumbent Democratic U.S. Senator James Eastland won re-election to his sixth term. , this was the last time that the Democrats won the Class 2 Senate seat in Mississippi.

Democratic primary

Candidates

Declared
James Eastland, incumbent Senator
 Louis Fondren, State Representative
 Taylor Webb, president of the Mississippi Economic Council

Withdrew
 C. L. McKinley, pipefitter (to run as an independent candidate)

Results

Republican primary

Candidates
 Gil Carmichael, businessman
 James Meredith, Civil Rights Movement icon

Campaign
Meredith ran as an anti-Nixon candidate, while Carmichael supported President Nixon's re-election.

Results

General election

Candidates
 Gil Carmichael, businessman (Republican)
 James Eastland, incumbent Senator since 1943 (Democratic)
  C.L. McKinley, pipefitter (Independent)
 Prentiss Walker, former Congressman and Republican nominee for Senate in 1966 (Independent)

Results

See also 
 1972 United States Senate elections

References 

1972
Mississippi
United States Senate